Molly Wright Steenson (born 1971) is an American professor of design and a historian of architecture and technology. She is the K&L Gates Associate Professor of Ethics and Computational Technologies and Senior Associate Dean for Research in the College of Fine Arts at Carnegie Mellon University.

Life and career
Steenson is a historian of design, architecture, and the history of those concepts alongside cybernetics and artificial intelligence. Her current research focuses on the idea of artificial intelligence and how it's viewed and portrayed in contemporary media and culture. She argues that our ideas of artificial intelligence are outdated and this inhibits peoples' ability to understand what it really is. Her book Architectural Intelligence: How Designers & Architects Created the Digital Landscape, published with Graham Foundation support, combines "an architectural history of interactivity and an interactive history of architecture."

Steenson holds a PhD in Architecture from Princeton University, a Master’s in Environmental Design from Yale School of Architecture, and a BA in German from the University of Wisconsin-Madison.

Publications

Books
 Architectural Intelligence: How Designers & Architects Created the Digital Landscape (MIT Press, 2017)
 Bauhaus Futures (MIT Press, 2019), co-edited with Laura Forlano & Mike Ananny.

Articles
 "Beyond the Personal and Private: Modes of Mobile Phone Sharing in India," The Reconstruction of Space and Time: Mobile Communication Practices (2008)
 "Interfaces to the Subterranean," Cabinet 41 (summer 2011) - about postal services and pneumatic tube systems

References

External links
 Personal website

1971 births
Living people
Architectural design
Carnegie Mellon University faculty
Princeton University alumni
Yale School of Architecture alumni
University of Wisconsin–Madison College of Letters and Science alumni
American women historians
American architectural historians
Historians of technology
21st-century American historians
21st-century American women writers